Guidara is a surname. Notable people with the surname include: 

Ghazi Guidara (born 1974), Tunisian volleyball player
Tomás Guidara (born 1996), Argentine footballer
Will Guidara (born 1979), American restaurateur